Atomic Fire is a record label and mail order record distributor based in Germany. It was founded by Markus Staiger in 2021.

History 
In 2021, Nuclear Blast founder Markus Staiger launched a new record company called Atomic Fire GmbH.
Several bands previously with Nuclear Blast had already signed on by the time of the public announcement, including Helloween, Opeth, Meshuggah, Amorphis, and Sonata Arctica.

On 21 November 2022, the Finnish hard rock/heavy metal band Lordi announced their signing to Atomic Fire Records.

See also 
 List of record labels

References

External links 
 Atomic Fire Records

German independent record labels
Record labels established in 2021
Heavy metal record labels
Death metal record labels